

Olympic Games

World Championships

World Cup Classics

Continental Championships

Asian Championships

European Championships

National Championships
 2008 Dutch National Track Championships
 French National Track Championships
 Australian National Track Championships
 British National Track Championships
 United States National Track Championships

Six-day events
The 2008 Six Days Track Cycling Events are multi-race competitions, each taking place over six days at various locations in mainland Europe. The riders challenge each other in track cycling disciplines including the madison, track time trials, sprints, and Derny motor-paced races.

The competitions are organised by the UCI.

Other events
 Revolution (cycling series) – Season 5

See also
2008 in women's road cycling
2008 in men's road cycling
2008 in sports
2007 in track cycling

 
Track cycling by year